Nayarambalam is a suburb of Cochin city and coastal village on Vypin island in Ernakulam District in the state of Kerala, India.

The village is surrounded by Edavanakkad Gram Panchayat to the north, Narakkal Gram Panchayat to the south, the Arabian Sea to the west and Veeranpuzha to the east. Nayarambalam lies almost at the center of Vypin Island. Agriculture and fishing were traditionally the main sources of income for the people, but now most of the people depend on Cochin city, the nearest city on the mainland. There are still many paddy fields and fish ponds especially in the eastern and western areas of the village.

Demographics
These details are taken from the official website of the Kerala Government.

Etymology 

 Nayarambalam, the name originated from Nakar (serpant) and Ambalam ( temple). The Nagaraja Temple then became Nakarambalam,later evolved into Nayarambalam.

Local administration 
Address:
Nayarambalam Grama Panchayat,
Nayarambalam - 682 509
Exisis managed by Nair ting Pres.in Nayarambalam Pauary-February 2007.

Elected members of Nayarambalam Panchayat
Nayarambalam Grama Panchayat: October 2015 election results:
 Ayurveda Hospital - Sarala Keshavan Ind LDF
 Bhagavathy Temple - Joby Varghese  INC  UDF
 Kadekurisu Ward   - Mary Jacob Kattuparambil Ind  Oth
 Kochambalam       - Suma Venu CPI(M) LDF
 Manattuparambu West - KS Rajan  IND LDF
 Manattuparambu East - Jessy Shiju  INC UDF
 Mangalya Ward     - EP Shibu  CPI(M) LDF
 Nedungad Central  - Elsabeth Joys (Joicy Thomas)  INC  UDF
 Puthankadapuram   - Anil Kumar BJP  BJP+
 Ramankulangara Ward - Parameshwaran Kanichadan  INC  UDF
 Temble West Ward - Sachitra Sarangan CPI(M) LDF
 Thayyezhath      - MS Sumesh CPI(M) LDF
 Thekke Nedungad  - Megha Dileep  CPI(M) LDF
 Vadakke Nedungad - PR Biju CPI(M) LDF
 Vadel Church Road - Anitha Thomas INC UDF
 Veliyathanparambu - KB Joshi CPI(M) LDF

This information was updated on 18 October 2017  based on Election Results of Local Body Election 2015 published by the Kerla State Election Commission.

Places of interest 

 Cherai Beach is 8 km away from Nayarambalam.
 In the east border of Nayarambalam is Vembanad lake which is known as Veeranpuzha.
 Nayarambalam has a good beach with very few visitors. Many people come here for angling.
 Bhagavathy Temple is one of the main Hindu temples in Nayarambalam, situated in the middle of the village facing the main Vypin-Munambam Road. The temple is maintained by Nayarambalam Nair Karayogam. The festival in the temple is observed every year during the 15th to 20th of the Malayalam month of Makaram (the last week of January to the first week of February). During the festivity period a variety of South Indian classical dance dramas and performing arts like Kathakali, Ottanthullal, Thayambaka, Panchavadyam, and Chendamelam are performed by renowned artists and performers.
 Badhra Bhagavathi Temple is another temple situated near Vypin Munambam Road. It faces the north and is believed to be very powerful. It warms the devotees with the goddess' divine grace and grants them their wishes. It is maintained by Pallathupadi Trust.

Roads 
Vypeen-Pallipuram State Highway 63 (SH 63) passes through Nayarambalam.

Hospitals 

The 25 bedded Govt. Ayurveda Hospital is owned by the public health department of the State Government of Kerala. The Public Health Center is situated in the beach area (Puthen Kadappuram). There are two medical centers in private sector also functioning here; one is Sarada Hospital (formerly Sarada Nursing Home),established in 1979,a dedicated multi speciality hospital which has been in patient care sector for the past 5 decades which includes general medicine, infertility, family medicine, neurology, cardiology, diabetology, dermatology, psychiatry and physiotherapy pioneered by Dr. K R Ramachandra Menon and Dr. Vanaja Menon with a vision of specialty care in the rural areas of Vypin. The other center is Nayarambalam Medical Centre. There are also several allopathic and homoeopathic clinics. In the speciality clinic, there is a small ENT clinic, Trinity, run by Dr. Thomas W Menacherry. A periodontic center, Smyle, run by Dr. Biniraj, is located just outside the Nayarambalam-Narakkal boundary.

Churches and temples 

Nayarambalam is blessed with many churches and temples. Nayarambalam Bhagavathy Temple, Sankara Narayana Temple, Kochambalam Sri Subrahmania Temple, and Mahavishnu Temple Veliyethamparambu, Mannateswari Bhagavathy temple are some of the prominent Hindu temples in Nayarmabmalam.

Major Christian churches include St. George Church (Wadel), established in the 1844, Sacred Heart Church (Manattuparambu) (both are under Verapoli Arch Diocese) St. Joseph's Church (Sanjopuram), and St. Augustine's Church (Nedungadu). In addition there are many small temples and chapels scattered around the village. A Muslim temple (mosque) is situated at the extreme north frontier of the village. There is also a Sri Sathya Sai Seva Samithi, which is active in the field of social service.

Educational institutions 
There are two high schools and many primary schools in Nayarambalam. These include Nayarambalam Bhagavathy Vilasom Higher Secondary School, Lobelia English Medium Higher Secondary School, Devi Vilasom Upper Primary School, and Vadel Lower Primary School.

Schools

Lower primary schools
There are three LP schools in Nayarambalam.
St. George LP School, Nayarambalam (Aided School): one of the oldest schools in Nayarambalam, managed by St. George Church, Wadel Nayarambalam
Sacred Heart LP School, Nedungad, Nayarambalam

Upper primary schools
Devi Vilasam UP School, Nayarambalam: Managed by Bhagavathy Temple Karayogam, Nayarambalam. School is located at Veliyathamparambu adjacent to the State Highway. Medium of instruction is Malayalam. Classes are held from Standard 6 to Standard 7.
Union UP School, Thekke Nedungad

High schools
Bhagavathy Vilasam High School (Aided School): One of the oldest high schools in Nayarambalam. Managed by Bhagavathy Temple Karayogam, Nayarambalam. Many Nayarambalam men received their high school education from this school. The same management runs another school, Devi Vilasam, in the lower primary level at Veliyathamparambu, Nayarambalam.

Higher secondary schools
Lobelia English Medium Higher Secondary School (private management): Lobelia is the first English medium school at Nayarambalam. It may be the first English medium school in Vypeen Island. Classes are held from Standard 1 to Standard 12 (Plus2). The school is located between Kochambalam and Kudungasserry, adjacent to the State Highway.

Special schools
Karuna Special School for Mentally Retarded Children: The school is managed by Sisters of St. George Carmel Convent. Located very near to St. George Church Wadel, Karuna School is the only special school in Vypeen Island.

Public schools
St. George Carmel Public School (private management): The school is managed by Sisters of St. George Carmel Convent.

Colleges

Prayaga College and Computer Academy
 Prayaga College, established in 1988, is the biggest parallel college-cum-tuition centre in the entire Vypeen Island. Approximately 1200 students are currently studying in this college. A wing of Prayaga, Prayaga Computer Academy (PCA), provides professional computer education in the island. The current principal and director is P. T. Prakasan.

Agriculture

Nayarambalam historically practiced the Pokkali cyclic paddy cultivation method. After the harvest, the decaying stubble of the paddy serves as food for the prawns and likewise the prawn excreta make the field fertile. No pesticides or fertilizers are used in the fields, in contrast to other prevalent farming practices.

As in other areas of Kerala, paddy fields are widely being reclaimed in Nayarambalam. Pokkali paddy-cum-prawn farming (cyclic farming method) was the traditional practice for farming. The Pokkali farming method is an eco-friendly farming practice.

Gallery

References

External links 
 http://nayarambalam.blogspot.com
 http://www.nayarambalambhagavathy.com/home.htm (presently inactive)
 http://bhagavathytemple.blogspot.com
 http://veeranpuzha.blogspot.com
 

Cities and towns in Ernakulam district